Gillygooly is a small village and townland west of Omagh in County Tyrone, Northern Ireland. In the 2001 Census it had a population of 72 people. It lies within the Omagh District Council area. The earliest reference to the townland of Gillygooly is the anglicisation Killagauland from c1655, which may be .

See also 
List of villages in Northern Ireland

References 

NI Neighbourhood Information System

Villages in County Tyrone
Townlands of County Tyrone